Munkatch (or Munkacs) Hasidism (חסידות מונקאטש) is a Hasidic sect within Haredi Judaism of mostly Hungarian Hasidic Jews. It was founded and led by Polish-born Grand Rebbe Shlomo Spira, who was the rabbi of the town of Strzyżów (1858–1882) and Munkacs (1882–1893). Members of the congregation are mainly referred to as Munkacs Hasidim, or Munkatcher Hasidim. It is named after the Hungarian town in which it was established, Munkatsh (in Yiddish; or in Hungarian: Munkács; today: Mukachevo, in Ukraine).

The largest Munkacs community is in Boro Park, Brooklyn; there are also significant Munkacs communities in Williamsburg, Brooklyn, and Monsey, New York; and other communities can be found across North America, in Europe, Israel, and Australia.

Lineage of the Munkacs Chasidic Dynasty

Roots

The dynasty traces its roots to Grand Rebbe Zvi Elimelech Spira (1783–1841), rabbi of Munkacs, and later of Dynów in Galicia. Himself an adherent of the Polish Hasidic leader Rabbi Yaakov Yitzchak of Lublin (the Chozeh of Lublin) and of his uncle, Rabbi Elimelech of Lizhensk, author of Noam Elimelech, Rabbi Spira was instrumental in bringing Hasidic Judaism to Hungary. He authored works such as Agra D'kala and Chidushei Mahartza, and is commonly called by the title of his most famous work B'nei Yissaschar ("Children of [the tribe] Issachar", named for the Biblical Issachar, son of Jacob, because he was told by Rabbi Yaakov Yitzchak of Lublin that he was a direct descendant of the tribe of Issachar). His descendants became leaders of the communities of Dynów, Poland (called Dinov in Yiddish), Munkacs, Hungary (now Mukachevo, Ukraine) (called Munkatch in Yiddish), and Błażowa, Poland (called Bluzhev in Yiddish). He was succeeded by his son, Rabbi Eluzer Spira of Lanczut, Poland, who was succeeded by his son, Rabbi Shlomo Spira of Munkacs, author of Shem Sh'lomo. He, in turn, was succeeded by his son, Rabbi Tzvi Hirsh Spira of Munkacs, author of Darkhei T'shuvah.

Pre-World War II Munkacs
The Rebbe of Munkatch, Grand Rebbe Chaim Elazar Spira, who led the community from 1913 until his death in 1937, was the most outspoken voice of religious anti-Zionism. He had succeeded his father, Grand Rebbe Zvi Hirsh Spira, who had earlier inherited the mantle of leadership from his father, Grand Rebbe Shlomo Spira. Rabbi Chaim Elazar led his community with unsurpassed dignity, and drew worldwide respect and honor for Munkács. His keen understanding and vast knowledge in Jewish as well as worldly matters drew thousands of people to his home where they sought his advice and blessings. Under his leadership, the Munkács Jewish community grew by leaps and bounds, and at the time of his death in 1937, over half of the town's inhabitants were Jewish. After his death in May 1937, leaving an only daughter, Frima, he was succeeded as rebbe by his son-in-law, Grand Rabbi Baruch Yehoshua Yerachmiel Rabinovich, who led the Munkacs dynasty with much success, until the outbreak of World War II. After World War II, Rabbi Baruch resigned as Rebbe.

Munkacs today

After the Holocaust, the Munkatch dynasty and community was re-established in the United States in Brooklyn, New York, and developed a close affinity with the Satmar Hasidim, who also originated from North-Eastern Hungary (namely Szatmár county, hence the name of the dynasty).
Currently, the Munkacs dynasty is led by the son of Rabbi Baruch, Grand Rebbe Moshe Leib Rabinovich.

The sect's main Brooklyn synagogue, which also serves as world headquarters for Munkacs Hasidim, is located in the Boro Park section of Brooklyn. The Hasidic group also boasts a plethora of educational and charitable institutions across the United States, Canada, England, Israel, and Australia.

Charitable institutions
The Munkacs Hasidic movement is famous for its many charitable organizations, which were founded by the current Grand Rebbe Rabbi Moshe Leib Rabinovich and his wife, Rebbetzin Perl Rabinovich. The Munkacs Bikur Cholim ("Visiting the sick"), Mazkereth Frima, founded by the Munkacser Rebbetzin in memory of the current Rebbe's mother, Rebbetzin Frima Rabinovich, is highly respected for helping Jewish people, regardless of affiliation, when they are ill in a hospital, taking care of their needs, such as financial aid for doctors' bills and other accommodations, both religious and general, as well as the needs of their families who visit them. Munkacs is also very active in the Ukrainian town of Mukachevo, the birthplace of the Hasidic sect, where it helps run and fund synagogues, free kosher soup kitchens, educational and religious programs.

Educational institutions
Rabbi Moshe Leib Rabinovich founded a network of large educational institutions, both yeshivas and girls' schools, running from pre-school through high school, as well as post-graduate advanced-learning kollels for married men. The girl's schools are called Bnos Frima, and the yeshivas Tiferes Bunim. Munkacs also operates youth summer camps, Chaim V'Shalom, in the Catskill Mountains during the summer months.

Publishing
Hotzoas EMES (Hebrew acronym for O'hr T'orah M'unkacs) publishes the works of the rebbes of Munkacs, as well as periodicals on news and subjects of interest to the Munkacs Hasidic community. To date, they have published hundreds of works, which are used by Talmudic scholars around the world.

Spiritual lineage from Baal Shem Tov
Rebbe Yisrael Baal Shem Tov – founder of Hasidism
Rebbe Dovber, the Maggid of Mezritch – primary disciple of the Baal Shem Tov
Rebbe Elimelech of Lizhensk, author of Noam Elimelech – disciple of the Maggid of Mezritch
Rebbe Yaakov Yitzchak, the Seer of Lublin, author of Zikoron Zos – disciple of Rebbe Elimelech of Lizhensk

Dynasty
Grand Rabbi Tzvi Elimelech Spira of Dynów, author of B'nei Yisoschor, a disciple of the Seer of Lublin
Grand Rabbi Eleazar Spira of Strzyżów and Łańcut, author of Yod'ei Binah, son of the B'nei Yisoschor
Grand Rabbi Shlomo Spira of Strzyżów and Munkatch, author of Shem Sh'lomo, son of the Yod'ei Binah
Grand Rabbi Tzvi Hirsch Spira of Munkatch, author of Darkhei T'shuvah, son of the Shem Sh'lomo
Grand Rabbi Chaim Elazar Spira of Munkatch, author of Minchas El'azar, son of the Darkhei T'shuvah
Grand Rabbi Baruch Yehoshua Yerachmiel Rabinovich, son-in-law of the Minchas El'azar
Grand Rabbi Moshe Leib Rabinovich, son of Rebbe Baruch, current Munkatcher Rebbe

External links
Religious Life in Munkács Before the Holocaust on the Yad Vashem website
Mukacheve, Ukraine (Munkács, HU) ShtetLink on JewishGen.org
Wedding of the Daughter of Rabbi Chaim Elazar Shapira in Munkács, 15.03.1933 from Yad Vashem
A Film of Jewish Life in Munkacs - includes footage of the Munkacser Rebbe, zt"l, author of Minchas Elazer 
A Video Clip of the Present Rebbe of Munkatch celebrating Purim
A Video Clip of the Present Rebbe of Munkatch celebrating Lag B'omer
A Video Clip of the Present Rebbe of Munkatch celebrating Sukkot
Video of Celebrations of Sukkot in various Hassidic Courts, including Munkatch
Satellite view of Mukachevo, Ukraine
Complete Collection of the works of the Rebbes of Munkacs
About the Rabbis in Strzyzow, The Spiritual Strzyzow, By Shlomo Yahalomi

 
Hasidic dynasties
Jewish Hungarian history
Hasidic anti-Zionism

yi:מונקאטש